Bootleg is a fictional superheroine created by Eric Stephenson and Todd Nauck for Image Comics (under the Extreme Studios imprint) title New Men and was the second team member the two introduced to the series, after Pilot, a character who was almost identical to the X-Men's Bishop, and debuted in her civilian identity in the 9th issue of the New Men ongoing series, but did not encounter the team themselves until issue 12.

Fictional character biography
Jamie Forester was the frustrated daughter of a wealthy family unhappy with her mundane life and clichéd existence and unsure of her future who was also having unwanted 'adrenalin rushes', which she later found to be part of her powers as a 'Nu Gene Positive'.  The Nu Gene was the New Men's universe's equivalent of the Mutants from Marvel Comics' X-Men franchise. Jamie first came into contact with the New Men during a very public battle between them and their member Reign, and an enemy/old ally Khyber, the gem Reign has on his forehead had mind controlling properties and caused him to go on a minor rampage. Jamie had been searching for the New Men, with help of her friend Paul, who knew New Men member Exit, after putting a boy in a coma with her powers, here Jamie accidentally exhibited a brief burst of Dash, the team's female speedster's speed, John Proctor, the group's mentor recognized her is Nu-Gene Positive.

After this Jamie became part of New Men and moved into Proctor's lodge, unlike many characters of her ilk, she was thrilled about her new life, having been looking for something to do with her life, she later admitted to being scared, not of the danger or pressure that being in the team created, but of the experience ending. In most of her appearances up until issue 20 she often played the stereotypical 'new girl' character, bewildered, confused or 'freaked out' by occurrences, or being to 'take' or 'handle' situations she found herself in, perhaps most competent during the 'Dominion' story-line, where her and three other New Men were transported away (and Bootleg spent much of the story topless or wearing rags because Kodiak broke her bra) and during a solo fight with re-occurring series villain Elemental.

Following the disbanding of the New Men in the wake of the events of the Extreme Destroyer imprint-wide crossover and the New Force mini-series, Bootleg resumed normal life but became deeply unhappy and frustrated once again, she was then kidnapped, imprisoned and tormented by a secret organisation that sought to destroy the New Men.

Character
Despite her desire to be otherwise, Bootleg was usually portrayed as a very standard character for her situation and social standing, being considerate of her looks, having an 'attitude' and speaking in teen slang, similar to a wealthier version of Jubilee as portrayed in the early '90s X-Men animated series, she was often panicky 'stated the obvious'. Like most of the team, her character was refined and developed more after the series' revamp, and she became much more rounded and mature, as well as more adept at using her powers.

Powers
Bootleg is named in-series as being an 'energy syphon', what she in fact has is the ability to copy and use the powers and abilities of others simply by being near them, this power was not limited to superpowers and Bootleg was shown to borrow the most basic of abilities, such as a sporty college student's strength, built up by nothing more than simple training, though most of the time, given the stories, she was shown to be using other's superpowers.
Her powers seemed to have very little effect on her physical form, rarely, if ever taking on physical attributes of those whose powers she used.

Notes
Bootleg's powers are in nearly identical to that of Synch of Marvel's Generation X but, given her appearance, various story elements, and the New Men's close similarities to the core X-Men cast, that parallels drawn between her and Rogue would be far from inaccurate.

Image Comics female superheroes
Comics characters introduced in 1995